Marcus C. Lisle (September 23, 1862 – July 7, 1894) was an American lawyer, judge and politician from Kentucky who served as a member of the United States House of Representatives from 1893 until his death the following year.

Early life and career 
Born near Winchester, Kentucky, Lisle attended the common schools of his native county and the University of Kentucky at Lexington. He graduated from Columbia Law School, New York City, and was admitted to the bar and commenced legal practice in Winchester, Kentucky, in 1887. He later served as county judge of Clark County, Kentucky, in 1890.

Congress 
Lisle was elected as a Democrat to the Fifty-third Congress and served from March 4, 1893, until his death in Winchester, Kentucky, July 7, 1894, of "complication of consumption and Bright's disease".

Personal life
Lisle married Elizabeth "Lizzie" Buckner Bean (1866–1893) at the Presbyterian Church, Winchester, Kentucky, on April 27, 1887.  The first child born to this marriage was Ernest Claiborne Lisle (1888–1917).  On March 17, 1893, the infant son of Judge Lisle died and was buried beside the body of his mother, who had died a few days earlier.

Marcus Lisle was interred in Winchester Cemetery.

See also
List of United States Congress members who died in office (1790–1899)

References

External links
Newspaper clippings: search Lisle, Marcus Claiborne

1862 births
1894 deaths
Columbia Law School alumni
Democratic Party members of the United States House of Representatives from Kentucky
19th-century American politicians
19th-century deaths from tuberculosis
Tuberculosis deaths in Kentucky
Deaths from nephritis